Wayne Murray (born 29 July 1977) is a South African former cricketer. He played in 32 first-class and 34 List A matches for Eastern Province between 1997/98 and 2001/02.

See also
 List of Eastern Province representative cricketers

References

External links
 

1977 births
Living people
South African cricketers
Eastern Province cricketers
People from Graaff-Reinet
Cricketers from the Eastern Cape